The 1959 Detroit Tigers season was the 59th season for the American League franchise in Detroit. Although the Tigers lost 15 of their first 17 games in —resulting in the May 2 firing of manager Bill Norman—they recovered under his successor, Jimmy Dykes, to finish in fourth place with a record of 76–78, eighteen games behind the AL Champion Chicago White Sox.

Offseason 
 October 13, 1958: Maury Wills was sent to the Tigers by the Los Angeles Dodgers as part of a conditional deal.
 November 20, 1958: Billy Martin and Al Cicotte were traded by the Tigers to the Cleveland Indians for Don Mossi, Ray Narleski, and Ossie Álvarez.
 December 1, 1958: Lou Skizas was drafted from the Tigers by the Chicago White Sox in the 1958 rule 5 draft.
 Prior to 1959 season: Andy Kosco was signed as an amateur free agent by the Tigers.

Regular season

Season standings

Record vs. opponents

Notable transactions 
 April 2, 1959: Maury Wills was returned by the Detroit Tigers to the Los Angeles Dodgers as part of a conditional deal.
 June 13, 1959: Bob Smith was selected off waivers by the Tigers from the Pittsburgh Pirates.

Roster

Player stats

Batting

Starters by position 
Note: Pos = Position; G = Games played; AB = At bats; H = Hits; Avg. = Batting average; HR = Home runs; RBI = Runs batted in

Other batters 
Note: G = Games played; AB = At bats; H = Hits; Avg. = Batting average; HR = Home runs; RBI = Runs batted in

Pitching

Starting pitchers 
Note: G = Games pitched; IP = Innings pitched; W = Wins; L = Losses; ERA = Earned run average; SO = Strikeouts

Other pitchers 
Note: G = Games pitched; IP = Innings pitched; W = Wins; L = Losses; ERA = Earned run average; SO = Strikeouts

Relief pitchers 
Note: G = Games pitched; W = Wins; L = Losses; SV = Saves; ERA = Earned run average; SO = Strikeouts

Farm system

References

External links 

1959 Detroit Tigers season at Baseball Reference

Detroit Tigers seasons
Detroit Tigers season
Detroit Tigers
1959 in Detroit